"That's All It Took" is a song written by George Jones, Darrell Edwards, and Charlotte Lynn Grier and originally recorded by Jones as a duet with Gene Pitney  on Musicor Records.  Jones and Pitney had scored a Top 20 hit in 1965 with "I've Got Five Dollars and It's Saturday Night" and also recorded two LPs together.  However, "That's All It Took" was not a hit, only making it to number 47 on the Billboard country singles chart.  Although a rather obscure song, country-rock pioneer Gram Parsons recorded the song as a duet with Emmylou Harris on his debut solo album GP in 1973.  A live version by Parsons and his band the Fallen Angels also appears on the 1982 release Live 1973.

Chart performance

References

1957 songs
Songs written by George Jones
George Jones songs
Song recordings produced by Pappy Daily